Uroteuthis bartschi, also known as Bartsch's squid,  is a species of squid growing to a known mantle length of 20 cm. It is the type species of the genus Uroteuthis.

References

External links

Tree of Life web project: Uroteuthis

Squid
Molluscs described in 1945